The 2016–17 Arkansas Razorbacks men's basketball team represented the University of Arkansas during the 2016–17 NCAA Division I men's basketball season. The team was led by sixth-year head coach Mike Anderson, and played their home games at Bud Walton Arena in Fayetteville, Arkansas as a member of the SEC.

Previous season

Arkansas was unable to continue the momentum it had built in 2014–15, after finishing second to Kentucky in the SEC and winning a game in the NCAA tournament for the first time in seven years. They lost Chicago Bulls forward Bobby Portis to the NBA and Michael Qualls also declared but wasn't drafted after sustaining a knee injury. Seniors Rashad Madden and Alandise Harris graduated, and Nick Babb elected to transfer to Iowa State.

In the offseason, returning players Jacorey Williams and Anton Beard, along with Colorado transfer Dustin Thomas, were involved in a counterfeiting scandal and Williams was later kicked off the team. Beard was suspended for the first semester and Thomas had to sit out the season anyway as part of NCAA transfer rules.

The Razorbacks lost to Florida in the second round of the SEC tournament.

Departures

Recruiting class of 2016

Recruiting class of 2017

{{College Athlete Recruit Entry
recruit  = Gabe Osabuohien 
position  = Forward (basketball)
hometown  = Toronto, Ontario, Canada; Little Rock, Arkansas
high school  = Southwest Christian Academy
feet  = 6
inches  = 8
weight  = 219
commit date  = 05/24/2017
scout stars  = 0
rivals stars  = 0
246 stars  = 3
espn stars  = 0
}}

Roster

Schedule

|-
!colspan=12 style="background:#; color:#FFFFFF;"| Spanish exhibition tour

|-
!colspan=12 style="background:#; color:#FFFFFF;"| Exhibition

|-
!colspan=12 style="background:#; color:#FFFFFF;"| Regular season

|-
!colspan=12 style="background:#;"| SEC Tournament

|-
!colspan=12 style="background:#C41E3A;"| NCAA tournament

References

Arkansas Razorbacks men's basketball seasons
Arkansas
Arkansas
Razor
Razor